was a Japanese photographer and inventor.

References

Japanese photographers
1801 births
1870 deaths
Place of birth unknown
Date of death missing
Place of death missing
Date of birth unknown
Karakuri